Copake Lake is a community (and census-designated place) in southern Columbia County, New York, United States. The population was 823 at the 2010 census.

The community is named after Copake Lake, a lake by the west town line of the town of Copake. Copake means "snake pond" in the native language.

Geography
Copake Lake is located at  (42.147128, -73.597614). The community surrounds the water body of Copake Lake, part of the Taghkanic Creek watershed flowing west to the Hudson River. Most of the CDP is in the town of Copake, while about 20% of it extends westward into the town of Taghkanic.

Demographics

As of the census of 2000, there were 762 people, 302 households, and 205 families residing in the CDP. The population density was 79.4 per square mile (30.7/km2). There were 811 housing units at an average density of 84.6/sq mi (32.7/km2). The racial makeup of the CDP was 96.19% White, 0.39% African American, 0.26% Native American, 0.79% from other races, and 2.36% from two or more races. Hispanic or Latino of any race were 1.57% of the population.

There were 302 households, out of which 30.5% had children under the age of 18 living with them, 54.0% were married couples living together, 8.6% had a female householder with no husband present, and 31.8% were non-families. 27.5% of all households were made up of individuals, and 9.6% had someone living alone who was 65 years of age or older. The average household size was 2.52 and the average family size was 3.02.

In the CDP, the population was spread out, with 22.7% under the age of 18, 8.3% from 18 to 24, 26.8% from 25 to 44, 29.9% from 45 to 64, and 12.3% who were 65 years of age or older. The median age was 39 years. For every 100 females, there were 104.3 males. For every 100 females age 18 and over, there were 105.9 males.

References

External links
Copake Lake Conservation Society

Census-designated places in New York (state)
Census-designated places in Columbia County, New York